Club Deportivo Palencia Cristo Atlético is a Spanish football team based in Palencia, in the autonomous community of Castile and León. Founded in 1985, it plays in Segunda División RFEF – Group 1, holding home games at Estadio Nueva Balastera, with a capacity of 8,100 seats.

History

Founded in 1985, Cristo Atlético promoted for the first time to the fourth division in 2004, but could not avoid the relegation positions in its first experience. The club came back in 2009 but would not consolidate in the league 2011, when it remained in Tercera División for the first time.

In 2017, Cristo Atlético qualified for the first time to the promotion play-offs to Segunda División B, where after eliminating Real Avilés in the first round, was eliminated after a penalty shootout by Deportivo Alavés B.

Club background
Club Deportivo Cristo Atlético Palencia 1985–2017
Club Deportivo Palencia Cristo Atlético 2017–present

Stadium
Until 2012, Cristo Atlético played its games at Estadio Cristo del Otero, with a pitch of artificial turf and located at the feet of the namesake monument. After moving to Estadio Nueva Balastera in that season, Estadio Cristo del Otero is used for the youth teams of the club and for other teams from Palencia.

Season to season

2 seasons in Segunda División RFEF
13 seasons in Tercera División

References

External links
Official website 
Futbolme team profile 

Football clubs in Castile and León
Association football clubs established in 1985
1985 establishments in Spain
Sport in Palencia